Leo Reino Sario (18 May 1916 – 15 August 2009) was a Finnish-born mathematician who worked on complex analysis and Riemann surfaces.

Early life and education
After service as a Finnish artillery officer in the Winter War and World War II, he received his PhD in 1948 under Rolf Nevanlinna at the University of Helsinki.

Career
Nevanlinna and Sario were founding members of the Academy of Finland, and there is a statue on the Academy grounds named after Sario. Sario moved to the United States in 1950 and obtained temporary positions at the Institute for Advanced Study, MIT, Stanford University, and Harvard University. In 1954 he became a professor at UCLA, remaining there until his retirement in 1986.

He was the author or co-author of five major books on complex analysis and over 130 papers. He supervised 36 doctoral students, including Kōtarō Oikawa and Burton Rodin.

Awards and honors
In 1957 he was awarded the Cross of the Commander of Finland's Order of Knighthood. He was a Guggenheim Fellow for the academic year 1957–1958.

Selected publications
with Lars Ahlfors: Riemann surfaces, Princeton Mathematical Series 26, Princeton University Press 1960 2015 pbk reprint
with Kiyoshi Noshiro: Value Distribution Theory, Van Nostrand 1966 2013 pbk reprint
with Burton Rodin: Principal Functions, Springer 1968, Van Nostrand 1968; 2012 pbk reprint
with Kōtarō Oikawa: Capacity Functions, Grundlehren der mathematischen Wissenschaften 149, Springer 1969
with Mitsuru Nakai: Classification Theory of Riemann Surfaces, Grundlehren der mathematischen Wissenschaften 164, Springer 1970; 2012 pbk reprint 
with Mitsuru Nakai, Cecilia Wang, Lung Ock Chung: Classification Theory of Riemannian Manifolds : Harmonic, quasiharmonic and biharmonic functions, Lecture Notes in Mathematics 605, Springer 1977; 2006 pbk reprint
Capacity of a boundary and of a boundary element, Annals of Mathematics, vol. 59, 1954, pp. 135–144

References

Complex analysts
Mathematical analysts
20th-century Finnish mathematicians
Finnish emigrants to the United States
Institute for Advanced Study visiting scholars
University of Helsinki alumni
University of California, Los Angeles faculty
1916 births
2009 deaths